This is a fragmentary list of people who were imprisoned at Dachau concentration camp.

Clergy

Dachau had a special "priest block." Of the 2720 priests (among them 2579 Catholic) held in Dachau, 1034 did not survive the camp. The majority were Polish (1780), of whom 868 died in Dachau.
 Gavrilo V, Serbian Patriarch of the Serbian Orthodox Church, imprisoned in Dachau from September to December 1944
 a number of the Polish 108 Martyrs of World War II:
 Father Jean Bernard (1907–1994), Roman Catholic priest from Luxembourg who was imprisoned from May 1941 to August 1942. He wrote the book Pfarrerblock 25487 about his experiences in Dachau
 Blessed Titus Brandsma, Dutch Carmelite priest and professor of philosophy, died 26 July 1942
 Norbert Čapek (1870–1942) founder of the Unitarian Church in the Czech Republic
 Blessed Stefan Wincenty Frelichowski, Polish Roman Catholic priest, died 23 February 1945
 August Froehlich, German Roman Catholic priest, he protected the rights of the German Catholics and the maltreatment of Polish forced labourers
 Hilary Paweł Januszewski
 Ignacy Jeż later a Catholic Bishop
 Joseph Kentenich, founder of the Schoenstatt Movement, spent three and a half years in Dachau
 Bishop Jan Maria Michał Kowalski, the first Minister Generalis (Minister General) of the order of the Mariavites. He perished on 18 May 1942, in a gas chamber in Schloss Hartheim.
 Adam Kozlowiecki, later a Polish Cardinal
 Max Lackmann, Lutheran pastor and founder of League for Evangelical-Catholic Reunion.
 Blessed Karl Leisner, in Dachau since 14 December 1941, liberated 4 May 1945, but died on 12 August from tuberculosis contracted in the camp
 Josef Lenzel, German Roman Catholic priest, helped the Polish forced labourers
 Bernhard Lichtenberg – German Roman Catholic priest, was sent to Dachau but died on his way there in 1943
 Martin Niemöller, imprisoned in 1941, liberated 4 May 1945
 Nikolai Velimirović, bishop of the Serbian Orthodox Church and an influential theological writer, venerated as saint in the Eastern Orthodox Church.
 Engelmar Unzeitig (1911–1945) He was a professed member of the Mariannhill Missionaries. The Gestapo arrested Unzeitig on 21 April 1941 for defending Jews in his sermons and sent him to the Dachau concentration camp without a trial on 8 June 1941. In the autumn of 1944 he volunteered to help in catering to victims of typhoid but he soon contracted the disease himself. Unzeitig died of the disease on 2 March 1945 and was cremated. He became known as the "Angel of Dachau".
 Lawrence Wnuk
 Nanne Zwiep, Pastor of the Dutch Reformed Church in Enschede, spoke out from the pulpit against Nazis and their treatment of Dutch Citizens and anti-Semitism, arrested 20 April 1942, died in Dachau of exhaustion and malnutrition 24 November 1942
More than two dozen members of the Religious Society of Friends (known as Quakers) were interned at Dachau. They may or may not have been considered clergy by the Nazis, as all Quakers perform services which in other Protestant denominations are considered the province of clergy. Over a dozen of them were murdered there.
 Titus Brandsma, Dutch priest, philosopher and former rector of Nijmegen University

Communists
 Alfred Andersch, held 6 months in 1933
 Hans Beimler, imprisoned but escaped. Died in the Spanish Civil War.
 Emil Carlebach (Jewish), in Dachau since 1937, sent to Buchenwald concentration camp in 1938
 Alfred Haag, In Dachau from 1935 to 1939, when moved to Mauthausen
 Adolf Maislinger
 Oskar Müller, in Dachau from 1939, liberated 1945
 Walter Vielhauer
 Nikolaos Zachariadis (Greek), from November 1941 to May 1945

Jews
 Hinko Bauer, notable Croatian architect
 Bruno Bettelheim, imprisoned in 1938, freed in 1939; left Germany
 Jakob Ehrlich, Member of Vienna's City Council (Rat der Stadt Wien), died in Dachau 17 May 1938
 Viktor Frankl, neurologist and psychiatrist from Vienna, Austria
 Henry P. Glass, Austrian Architect and Industrial Designer, transferred to Buchenwald in September 1938.
 Zvi Griliches – Notable American economist
 Ludwig Kahn, German World War I Veteran and Entrepreneur from 29 Karls Street, Weilheim, Bavaria imprisoned 10 November 1938, freed 19 December 1938
 Hans Litten, anti-Nazi lawyer, died in 1938 by apparent suicide
 Otto Metzger, (1885–1961), German/British engineer and inventor of impact extrusion of containers
 Henry Morgentaler, also survived the Łódź Ghetto, later emigrated to Canada and became central to the abortion-rights movement there
 Alfred Müller, known Croatian entrepreneur from Zagreb
 Benzion Miller, born at the camp, son of Aaron Miller
 Moshe Sanbar, Governor of the Bank of Israel

Politicians

 Léon Blum – briefly, having been evacuated from Buchenwald concentration camp
 Jan Buzek, murdered in November 1940
 Theodor Duesterberg, briefly imprisoned in 1934
 Leopold Figl, arrested 1938, released 8 May 1943
 Andrej Gosar, Slovenian politician and political theorist, arrested in 1944
 Karl Haushofer
 Miklós Horthy Jr.
 Alois Hundhammer, arrested 21 June 1933, freed 6 July 1933
 Miklós Kállay
 Franz Olah, arrested in 1938 and transported on the first train of Austrian prisoners to Dachau.
 Hjalmar Schacht, arrested 1944, liberated April 1945
 Richard Schmitz
 Kurt Schumacher, in Dachau since July 1935, sent to Flossenbürg concentration camp in 1939, returned to Dachau in 1940, released due to extreme illness 16 March 1943
 Kurt Schuschnigg, the last fascist chancellor of Austria before the Austrian Nazi Party was installed by Hitler, shortly before the Anschluss
 Stefan Starzyński, the Mayor of Warsaw, probably murdered in Dachau in 1943
 Petr Zenkl, Czech national socialist politician

Resistance fighters and foreign agents

 Yolande Beekman, Special Operations Executive agent, murdered 13 September 1944
 Georges Charpak, who in 1992 received the Nobel Prize in Physics
 Madeleine Damerment, Special Operations Executive agent, murdered 13 September 1944
 Charles Delestraint, French general and leader of French resistance; executed by Gestapo in 1945
 Johann Georg Elser, who tried to assassinate Hitler in 1939, murdered 9 April 1945
 Arthur Haulot
 Suzy van Hall, Dutch dancer, member of the Dutch Resistance; liberated in 1945
 Noor Inayat Khan , Special Operations Executive agent of Indian origin, served as a clandestine radio operator in Paris, murdered 13 September 1944 when she and her SOE colleagues were shot in the back of the head
 George Maduro, Dutch law student and cavalry officer posthumously awarded the medal of Knight 4th-class of the Military Order of William.
 Kurt Nehrling, murdered in 1943
 Eliane Plewman, Special Operations Executive agent, murdered 13 September 1944
 Enzo Sereni, Special Operations Executive agent, Jewish, son of King Victor Emmanuele's personal physician. Parachuted into Nazi-occupied Italy, captured by the Germans and executed in November 1944. Kibbutz Netzer Sereni in Israel is named after him.
 Jean ("Johnny") Voste, the one documented black prisoner, was a Belgian resistance fighter from the Belgian Congo; he was arrested in 1942 for alleged sabotage and was one of the survivors of Dachau

Royalty
 Antonia, Crown Princess of Bavaria
 Albrecht, Duke of Bavaria
 Princess Irmingard of Bavaria
 Franz, Duke of Bavaria
 Grand Duchess Kira Kirillovna of Russia
 Prince Louis Ferdinand of Prussia
 Prince Max, Duke in Bavaria
 Philipp, Landgrave of Hesse
 Maximilian, Duke of Hohenberg
 Prince Ernst von Hohenberg
 Prince Xavier of Bourbon-Parma
 Duke of Anhalt, Prince Joachin Ernst of Anhalt, he died in a soviet camp in 1947 in Buchenwald.

Scientists

Among many others, 183 professors and lower university staff from Kraków universities, arrested on 6 November 1939 during Sonderaktion Krakau.

Writers
 Fran Albreht, Slovenian poet
 Robert Antelme, French writer
 Raoul Auernheimer, writer, in Dachau 4 months
 Tadeusz Borowski, writer, survived, but committed suicide in 1951
 Adolf Fierla, Polish poet
 Viktor Frankl, an Austrian psychiatrist and writer
 Fritz Gerlich, a German journalist
 Stanisław Grzesiuk, Polish writer, poet and singer, in Dachau from 4 April 1940, later transferred to Mauthausen
 Heinrich Eduard Jacob, German writer, in Dachau 6 months in 1938, transferred to Buchenwald
 Stefan Kieniewicz, Polish historian
 Juš Kozak, Slovenian playwright
 Friedrich Marby, German occult writer
 Gustaw Morcinek, Polish writer
 Boris Pahor, Slovenian writer
 Karol Piegza, Polish writer, teacher and folklorist
 Gustaw Przeczek, Polish writer and teacher
 Friedrich Reck-Malleczewen, German writer
 Franz Roh, German art critic and art historian, for a few months in 1933
 Jura Soyfer, writer, in Dachau 6 months in 1938, transferred to Buchenwald
 Adam Wawrosz, Polish poet and writer
 Stanisław Wygodzki, Polish writer
 Stevo Žigon (number: 61185), Serbian actor, theatre director, and writer, in Dachau from December 1943 to May 1945

Military
 Konstantinos Bakopoulos, Greek general
 Bogislaw von Bonin, Wehrmacht officer, opponent
 Franz Halder, former Chief of German Army General Staff
 Georgios Kosmas, Greek general
 Alexander Papagos, commander-in-chief of the Greek Army in 1940–41, future Prime Minister of Greece
 Ernest Peterlin, Slovenian military officer
 Ioannis Pitsikas, Greek general
 Karl Chmielewski, former SS Officer, tried for stealing diamonds from inmates while commandant of Gusen concentration camp.
 Alexander von Falkenhausen, German general who resisted Hitler

Others
 Jan Ertmański, Polish boxer who competed in the 1924 Summer Olympics
 Brother Theodore, comedian
 Bruno Franz Kaulbach, Austrian lawyer
 Rosemarie Koczy, German artist
 Zoran Mušič, Slovenian painter
 Ona Šimaitė, Lithuanian librarian
 Tullio Tamburini, Italian police chief
 Fritz Thyssen, businessman and early supporter of Hitler, later an opponent
 Morris Weinrib, father of Rush singer, bassist, keyboardist Geddy Lee
 Władysław Dworaczek, Polish educator

References

German military-related lists
Lists of Nazi concentration camps
Lists of prisoners and detainees
Dachau concentration camp
Germany in World War II-related lists